Neopalame deludens is a species of beetle in the family Cerambycidae. It was described by Monné in 1985.

References

Acanthocinini
Beetles described in 1985